Aljančić is a surname. Notable people with the surname include:

Ernest Aljančič (1916–2006), Slovenian ice hockey player and official
Ernest Aljančič Jr. (1945–2021), Slovenian ice hockey player and ice hockey official
Janez Aljančič (born 1982), Slovenian footballer
Slobodan Aljančić (1922–1993), Serbian mathematician